Callulops marmoratus is a species of frog in the family Microhylidae. It is endemic to Papua New Guinea and only known from its type locality, Crater Mountain Wildlife Management Area in the southwestern Chimbu Province, on the southern escarpment of the New Guinea Highlands.

Description
Four juveniles ranged  in SVL. The head is relatively wide and the snout is short. The canthus rostralis is rounded. The tympanum is indistinct. Both fingers and toes are unwebbed but have moderately enlarged disks. Skin is smooth. The dorsum shows an irregular pattern of dark brown mottling, to which the specific name marmoratus (=Latin for "mottled") refers to. The pattern is more diffuse in the juveniles.

Habitat and conservation
One of adults was found underground while digging, whereas the other two adults were found in a ditch. Two juveniles were at entrances to small burrows. Thus, the species appears to be terrestrial or fossorial, in agreement with its morphology.

There are no known threats to this species. The Crater Mountain Wildlife Management Area is a protected area.

References

marmoratus
Endemic fauna of Papua New Guinea
Amphibians of Papua New Guinea
Frogs of Asia
Amphibians described in 2003
Taxonomy articles created by Polbot